Yek Bhai (Yak Bai) is the highest peak in the mountain range laying in west of Dera Ghazi Khan, Pakistan. Its height is 7400 feet above sea level. From top of the mountain it is possible to see both Punjab and Baluchistan.

References

Mountains of Pakistan